The Iglesia de San Pedro Mártir was a Mudéjar church located in Calatayud (Aragon). It was demolished in 1856.

See also
List of missing landmarks in Spain

References

Demolished buildings and structures in Spain
Mudéjar architecture in Aragon
Calatayud
Churches completed in 1255
Churches completed in 1368
Roman Catholic churches completed in 1421
Former churches in Spain
Buildings and structures demolished in 1856
13th-century Roman Catholic church buildings in Spain
14th-century Roman Catholic church buildings in Spain
15th-century Roman Catholic church buildings in Spain